The Colville National Forest is a U.S. National Forest located in northeastern Washington state. It is bordered on the west by the Okanogan–Wenatchee National Forest and the Kaniksu National Forest to the east. The forest also borders Little Pend Oreille National Wildlife Refuge and the Lake Roosevelt National Recreation Area.

As of October 2020, the Colville National Forest now includes the Tonasket Ranger District, which was previously part of the Okanogan–Wenatchee National Forest.

Geography
The forest encompasses a mountainous area consisting of the Kettle River and Selkirk mountain ranges, and the upper reaches of the Columbia River. 

The forest has a total area of 1.5 million acres. In descending order of forestland area it is located in parts of Ferry, Pend Oreille, Okanogan, Stevens counties. The forest headquarters is located in Colville, Washington. There are local ranger district offices located in Kettle Falls, Metaline Falls, Newport, Republic, and Tonasket. Most of the Salmo-Priest Wilderness lies within the forest, while its southeastern portion extends into Kaniksu National Forest. With the inclusion of the Tonasket Ranger District, portions of the Pasayten Wilderness are within the forest.

Fauna
Wildlife include grizzly and black bears, wolf packs, bighorn sheep, cougars, bald eagles, Canada lynx, moose, beavers, loons, and up until recently, the last remaining herd of caribou in the lower 48 US states.

Other protected areas
The Pacific Northwest National Scenic Trail passes through the Colville National Forest. It enters the forest on the east side within the Salmo-Priest Wilderness, crosses the Pend Oreille River at Boundary Dam, passes through Leadpoint and Northport, then traverses the Kettle Range and exits the Colville near Republic. The Sullivan Lake Trail, designated a National Recreation Trail in 1978, runs  between two campgrounds in the forest.

See also
International Selkirk Loop

References

External links
USDA Forest Service - Colville National Forest

Protected areas of Ferry County, Washington
National Forests of Washington (state)
Protected areas of Pend Oreille County, Washington
Protected areas of Stevens County, Washington
Protected areas established in 1907
1907 establishments in Washington (state)